The Geelong city centre is the urban center and main commercial locality of the Geelong metropolitan area, also referred to as the Geelong CBD, Central Geelong, the Central Activities Area, or informally simply as "Town" by locals. The name of the area is officially gazetted as Geelong.

The Geelong city centre is the oldest part of Geelong and includes many of the city's historic landmarks such as the Geelong City Hall, St. Mary of the Angels Basilica, the T & G Building, Johnstone Park, Geelong railway station, and the old Geelong Post Office.  It is also a cultural area for the region, housing the Geelong Art Gallery and the Geelong Arts Centre, as well as the Deakin University waterfront campus. Tourist attractions include the Waterfront Geelong, Eastern Beach, and the National Wool Museum.

The city centre is one of Geelong's major shopping districts. Two large shopping malls, Westfield Geelong and Market Square Shopping Centre, have been opened in the last three decades, which has led to a decline in street shopping on the city's two main thoroughfares, Moorabool Street and Ryrie Street, resulting in a declining number of customers and some empty shops.

The Geelong city centre has seen some significant redevelopment since 2016. In 2018, the WorkSafe office building was opened, followed by the National Disability Insurance Agency (NDIA) national headquarters in 2019, significantly altering the skyline. New multi-storey apartment buildings, such as The Mercer and The Miramar, have also been built recently.

Population
In the 2016 Census, there were 5,210 people living in the Geelong city centre. 69.5% of people were born in Australia. The next most common countries of birth were England 3.1%, India 2.7%, Italy 2.0% and China 1.9%. 75.5% of people spoke only English at home. Other languages spoken included Italian 2.8% and Mandarin Chinese 2.4%. The most common responses for religion were No Religion 33.1% and Catholic 26.0%.

References

External links
Central Geelong revitalisation - City of Greater Geelong
Central Activities Area - City of Greater Geelong
Official Website of the Geelong Otway Tourism Region of the Great Ocean Road

Suburbs of Geelong